Dmitri Vladimirovich Dudik (born November 2, 1977) is a Belarusian former ice hockey player, who is currently the head coach of HK Lida of the Belarusian Extraleague. Dudik played for several teams in Belarus, Germany, and China in his playing career, which lasted from 1992 until 2011. Internationally he played for the Belarusian national team in multiple World Championships, and played in the 2002 Winter Olympics.

Career statistics

Regular season and playoffs

International

External links

1977 births
Living people
Belarusian ice hockey right wingers
China Dragon players
HC Dinamo Minsk players
HC Shakhtyor Soligorsk players
HK Gomel players
HK Neman Grodno players
Ice hockey players at the 2002 Winter Olympics
Keramin Minsk players
Nürnberg Ice Tigers players
Olympic ice hockey players of Belarus
Ice hockey people from Minsk
Tivali Minsk players
Yunost Minsk players